Eduardo "Edu" Manzano (born September 14, 1955) is an American and Filipino actor, fashion model, TV commercial model, comedian, politician, United States Air Force veteran and television game host.  He was previously the host of game shows The Weakest Link, Pilipinas, Game KNB?, 1 vs. 100  and  Asar Talo Lahat Panalo!.

Early life
Eduardo Manzano was born on September 14, 1955, in San Francisco, California, United States to Filipino parents. Due to his parentage (jus sanguinis) and the place of his birth (jus soli), he is a dual citizen of the Philippines and the United States, as per the laws of both countries.

Edu Manzano studied at De La Salle University in Manila.

Acting career
Manzano moved to the Philippines to pursue a full-time career with the local film industry. He was president of the actors’ group Katipunan ng mga Artista ng Pelikulang Pilipino in the 1990s.

He was part of ABS-CBN's roster of contract actors until he took leave to run as Vice-President of the Philippines in the 2010 general elections. However, he declared a loss and change of interest in and from show business to hosting current affairs programs

After losing the elections, Manzano signed a contract and returned to GMA Network. In 2010, he hosted the pre-noontime game show Asar Talo Lahat Panalo! and two more game/talent shows in 2011. After months of hiatus from TV, he hosted Family Feud: The Showdown Edition from April to July 2011. But Edu later defected to TV5 for a new TV show called Game 'N Go. In 2012, he joined the morning show called Good Morning Club.

In June 2017, Manzano returned to GMA Network to appear in Celebrity Bluff as a Master Bluffer.

In 2018, he also returned to ABS-CBN for his role in FPJ's Ang Probinsyano.

In January 2020, Edu is now officially a celebrity inductee winner for Eastwood City Walk Of Fame 2020 for contributions as a presenter, actor, comedian, endorser, and politician.

Sporting career
Aside from acting and political career, Manzano was also appointed as the executive vice-president of the Philippine Amateur Judo Association and the executive board member of the Philippine Olympic Committee.

Political career
Manzano entered politics in 1998 when he ran for Vice-Mayor of Makati. He garnered a majority of votes in the election, but his proclamation was suspended due to a case filed which alleged that he was not a Filipino citizen because he was born in the United States. The Supreme Court (Mercado v. Manzano) eventually ruled that he was indeed a Filipino citizen, clearing the way for his proclamation as Vice-Mayor. Following a three-year term, he lost his bid for campaign for Mayor of Makati in 2001 to Jejomar Binay.

In February 2004, Manzano became the first chairman of the Optical Media Board (OMB), a government agency tasked with combating optical media piracy. He resigned from the position in August 2009.

Manzano ran as the Lakas–Kampi's candidate for Vice-President in the May 2010 election as the running mate of presidential candidate Gilbert Teodoro. He lost again to Makati Mayor Jejomar Binay, placing fifth. Manzano is the co-founder of the non-profit advocacy organization called Ako Mismo.

In 2016, Manzano ran in the Senate, as he was part of Partido Galing at Puso coalition of presidential candidate Senator Grace Poe. He lost, finishing 21st overall in the COMELEC's partial and official senatorial tally.

In 2019, Manzano ran for Representative of San Juan under the Pwersa ng Masang Pilipino. However, he was disqualified and lost to incumbent representative Ronaldo Zamora.

Filmography

Film

Television

Discography
Edu Manzano: Dancer of the Universe (Universal Records, 2008)
World's Greatest Dance Steps (Universal Records, 2007)

Personal life 
He was married to Vilma Santos from 1980 to 1982 and they only have 1 child named Luis.

He was married to Maricel Soriano in 1989 and they have 2 children. Their marriage was annulled in 1991.

Awards and nominations

References

External links

1955 births
Living people
21st-century American comedians
ABS-CBN News and Current Affairs people
ABS-CBN personalities
American male actors of Filipino descent
Arroyo administration personnel
Candidates in the 2010 Philippine vice-presidential election
De La Salle University alumni
Filipino actor-politicians
Filipino game show hosts
Filipino male comedians
Filipino male film actors
Filipino male television actors
Filipino military personnel
Filipino people of American descent
Filipino people of Spanish descent
Filipino television talk show hosts
GMA Integrated News and Public Affairs people
GMA Network personalities
Heads of government agencies of the Philippines
Internet memes
Lakas–CMD politicians
Male actors from Iloilo
Male actors from Metro Manila
Male actors from San Francisco
People from Makati
Politicians from Iloilo
Politicians from Metro Manila
TV5 (Philippine TV network) personalities
United States Air Force airmen
University Athletic Association of the Philippines players
Visayan people
Viva Artists Agency